Austerdalsbreen is a glacier in the municipality of Luster in Vestland, Norway. 
It is a side branch of the Jostedalsbreen glacier, and is included in the Jostedalsbreen National Park. The glacier is fed by the three steep glaciers Odinbreen, Torbreen and Lokebreen. The lower, flat part of the glacier displays a characteristic fishbone or lobster tail pattern.

See also
List of glaciers in Norway

References

Glaciers of Vestland
Luster, Norway